Thomas Marshal Bibighaus (March 17, 1817 – June 18, 1853) was a Whig member of the U.S. House of Representatives from Pennsylvania.

Bibighaus was born in Philadelphia. He studied law, was admitted to the bar in 1839 and commenced practice in Lebanon, Pennsylvania.

He was elected as a Whig to the Thirty-second Congress. He was not a candidate for renomination in 1852 to the Thirty-third Congress owing to ill health. He resumed the practice of law in Lebanon and died there in 1853.

Sources

The Political Graveyard

1817 births
1853 deaths
People from Lebanon, Pennsylvania
Pennsylvania lawyers
Whig Party members of the United States House of Representatives from Pennsylvania
19th-century American politicians
19th-century American lawyers